Stephen John Duckett  (born 18 February 1950) is a health economist and think-tanker who has occupied many leadership roles in health services in both Australia and Canada, including as Secretary of the Commonwealth Department of Health and Ageing. He is current health program director at the Grattan Institute, an Australian public policy think tank, Emeritus Professor of Health Policy at La Trobe University, and Chairperson of South Australia's Health Performance Council.

Educational background
Stephen Duckett was born in Sydney and educated at Woollahra Public School (Opportunity classes) and Fort Street High School. He subsequently studied economics at the Australian National University (BEc) and health administration at the University of New South Wales (MHA, PhD).

Career 1970s to 2009

Duckett worked as an academic (Lecturer/Senior Lecturer) in the School of Health Administration at the University of New South Wales from 1974 to 1983. He was an active public commentator supporting Australia's Medicare scheme, and worked with a number of non-government organizations such as the Australian Council of Social Service and the New South Wales Council on the Ageing. His research also examined aspects of hospital administration

He worked in the Victorian health system for a number of years from 1983 including as Regional Director and subsequently Director of Acute Health for the Victorian Department of Health and Community Services, in the latter role he was responsible for introducing case mix funding to Australia. This was the first major application of this approach to hospital funding in a publicly funded health system

Duckett was appointed Departmental Secretary to the Australian Government Department of Human Services and Health on the recommendation of Prime Minister Paul Keating in 1994 and served in that role until the change of government following the 1996 federal election.

From 1996 to 2005 he worked at La Trobe University in Melbourne, Australia as Professor of Health Policy, Dean of the Faculty of Health Sciences and, for part of that period, Pro-Vice-Chancellor, Learning and Teaching. During this period he continued research on aspects of hospital economics and published a book on the Australian health care system.

Duckett served as chair of the board of directors of the Brotherhood of St Laurence (2000–2005) and of Bayside Health (2000–2006).

He was recruited to Queensland Health in 2006 in the wake of the Dr Death scandal, to lead improvements in quality and safety as chief executive officer of the Centre for Healthcare Improvement.

Alberta Health Services (2009–2010)

Duckett was hired by the provincial government of Alberta in the spring of 2009 as president and chief executive officer of its newly created health "superboard", Alberta Health Services with a significant reform agenda. (Alberta Health Services is a quasi-independent agency of the Alberta government created in May 2008 to operate hospitals and other public health services throughout the province of Alberta). Duckett moved to Edmonton Alberta and took up his duties on 23 March of that year.

Shortly after his appointment, the provincial government imposed a significant ($1billion) budget cut on Alberta Health Services. Implementation of these cuts by Alberta Health Services was unpopular and controversial.

Cookie controversy 

On 20 November 2010, Duckett came under scrutiny for televised remarks to the media following a high-level meeting about the situation in the province's emergency rooms. During the aired segment, Duckett refused to answer questions by reporters waiting outside the meeting room, using the excuse he was eating his cookie and that another person had been designated to make comments. He later issued an apology noting that he had not felt comfortable as a non-elected official being asked to respond to the comments of other, elected, officials. He has subsequently stated that he had been instructed by the office of Alberta Premier Stelmach not to make any comments. On 24 November 2010, following political intervention, the chairman of the Alberta Health Services Board announced that, by mutual agreement, Duckett would vacate his role. Both parties felt that his ability to continue in his duties had been "compromised". Three members of the Board of Directors of Alberta Health services also resigned. On 29 July 2011, based on the terms of his contract, Duckett was paid one year's salary as severance pay.

Career 2011–present
After leaving Alberta Health Services, Duckett worked as a professor in the School of Public Health at the University of Alberta, and published a book about the future of the health care system in Canada. He returned to Australia in 2012 and helped to design Australia's new activity based funding arrangements.  In late 2012 he joined Grattan Institute, a domestic public policy think tank based in Melbourne, as head of its Health program. He has since published reports identifying improvements to be made in pricing for Australia's Pharmaceutical Benefits Scheme and ways to improve paying for hospital care. He has also published on improving access to primary care in rural and remote Australia.

Dr Duckett was as a member of the South Australian Health Performance Council from 2012 to 2020. In 2021 he was re-appointed as the Council's Chairperson for the next four years.

Books 

Duckett S, Warburton J (2014). Foreword
 Duckett S, Peetoom A (2013). Canadian medicare: We need it and we can keep it
 Duckett S (2004). The Australian health care system
 Kendig H, Duckett S (2001). Australian directions in aged care: the generation of policies for generations of older people
 Duckett S (2000). The Australian Health Care System

Awards and recognition 
Duckett's academic contributions have been recognized by the University of New South Wales by the award of a higher doctorate, Doctor of Science, (DSc), and by election as a Fellow of the Academy of the Social Sciences in Australia (FASSA) in 2004 and of the Australian Academy of Health and Medical Sciences (FAHMS) in 2015. In the 2023 Australia Day Honours he was appointed a Member of the Order of Australia for "significant service to public health policy and management, and to tertiary education".

References

External links 
 https://web.archive.org/web/20091002192215/http://www.albertahealthservices.ca/251.asp
 http://www.albertahealthservices.ca/
 http://www2.canada.com/edmontonjournal/news/sundayreader/story.html?id=e39baa8a-a1af-4cbe-aaa7-ef610c0e0627&p=1

1950 births
21st-century Anglicans
Australian Anglicans
Australian expatriates in Canada
Australian National University alumni
Churchwardens
Fellows of the Australian Academy of Health and Medical Sciences
Living people
Members of the Order of Australia
People from Sydney
Recipients of the Centenary Medal
Secretaries of the Australian Government Health Department
Academic staff of the University of Alberta
University of New South Wales alumni
Academic staff of the University of New South Wales